The Time and the Place is an album by saxophonist Jimmy Heath featuring performances recorded in 1974 but not released until 1994 on the Landmark label.

Reception

Scott Yanow at Allmusic noted "Jimmy Heath, who is heard here on tenor, alto, soprano and flute, played at his prime throughout the 1970's although he tended to be somewhat overlooked in popularity polls. Heath was stretching himself during the era as can be heard on these obscure pieces".

Track listing
All compositions by Jimmy Heath except as indicated
 "The Time and the Place" – 9:34   
 "The Voice of the Saxophone" – 6:11   
 "No End"  (Kenny Dorham) – 7:06   
 "The 13th House" – 9:04   
 "Fau-Lu" – 8:07   
 "Studio Style" – 4:49

Personnel
Jimmy Heath – tenor saxophone, alto saxophone, soprano saxophone, flute, vocals
Curtis Fuller – trombone, vocals
Pat Martino – guitar
Stanley Cowell- piano, mbira
Sam Jones – bass
Billy Higgins – drums
Mtume – congas, percussion

References

Landmark Records albums
Jimmy Heath albums
1994 albums
Albums produced by Don Schlitten